Ulf "Uffe" Christian Johan Schmidt (born 12 July 1934) is a former Swedish tennis player. He competed for AIK from Stockholm.

He won 14 singles' tournaments, among them the International Swedish Championships in Båstad in 1957 and 1961. In 1958 he and Sven Davidson won the doubles event in Wimbledon after defeating the top seeds Ashley Cooper and Neale Fraser in the final. They were the only Swedish winners before the Borg era.

His best singles result at a Grand Slam tournament was reaching the semifinal at the 1958 U.S. National Championships. Schmidt was unseeded and defeated third-seeded Ham Richardson in the fourth round before losing to first-seeded Mal Anderson in the semifinal. At the Wimbledon Championships he reached the quarterfinals in 1956 and 1957.

Schmidt was ranked World No. 8 for 1958 by Lance Tingay of The Daily Telegraph (and No. 10 in 1961).

He played 102 Davis Cup matches for Sweden (1955–1964) and won 66 of them.

Grand Slam finals

Doubles (1 title)

References

External links
 
 
 

People from Nacka Municipality
Swedish male tennis players
Wimbledon champions (pre-Open Era)
1934 births
Living people
Grand Slam (tennis) champions in men's doubles
Sportspeople from Stockholm County